Peritas was Alexander the Great's favorite dog, who accompanied him during his military exploits. The name Peritas seems to come from the Ancient Greek word for January.

History

The eponymous city
Not much is known of the historical Peritas aside from a city named in his honor. Like Alexander's horse Bucephalus, Peritas was awarded a city named in his honor, with a monument to his glory in its central square. According to Plutarch, after recalling the story of Bucephalus, "It is said, too, that when he lost a dog also, named Peritas, which had been reared by him and was loved by him, he founded a city and gave it the dog's name." The city was probably somewhere in Pakistan, perhaps not far from the town named after Bucephalus, since both cities would have been the spoils of war for Alexander after having defeated King Porus at the Battle of the Hydaspes.

Dog type
What type of dog the mythical Peritas was, is hard to ascertain and remains unknown. Peritas is sometimes referred to as a Molossus, or a Bulldog, perhaps from the fierce nature of a few stories. Others will say Peritas would have been most likely the classic ancient Greek hunting dog the Laconian, as depicted in the mosaic.

Tales of Peritas
According to Pliny, it was the king of Caucasian Albania who delighted Alexander by giving him a dog which had attacked and beaten both a lion and an elephant. There is also the story of Alexander meeting Sophytes, a ruler of an area probably around Jech Doab in Punjab. Sophytes gave Alexander one hundred and fifty dogs known for their fearsome strength and courage. Wishing to test their strength, Sophytes had a lion fight two of the weakest dogs. He released two others to help once those two seemed at a disadvantage. The four were doing well against the lion when Sophytes sent a man with a scimitar to hack at a leg of one of the dogs. Alexander protested strongly, and guards took the man with the blade away, until Sophytes offered Alexander three dogs for that one. The dog then calmly accepted its fate without making a sound, and continued to have a firm bite on the lion until it had succumbed to its loss of blood. It is unlikely that any of these pertain to Peritas.

Popular media
Peritas appears as a posthumous character in the 2020 animated film Scoob!. He is depicted as Scooby-Doo's distant ancestor and a Great Dane whose bond with Alexander the Great sealed the gates of the Underworld. The film's antagonist, Dick Dastardly, seeks to combine Scooby's connection to Peritas and the three skulls of Cerberus to open the gates.

See also
 List of individual dogs

References

Individual dogs
Alexander the Great